NEN or Nen may refer to:

Acronym
Near Earth Network (formerly Ground Network), a NASA network of ground stations to support space flight missions
NEN (TV station), an Australian television station licensed to, and serving northern New South Wales
NEN (National Entrepreneurship Network), a Wadhwani Foundation initiative for building institutional capacity for entrepreneur support.

People 
Dick Nen (born 1939), former Major League first baseman
Nicolas Le Nen, French army officer
Robb Nen (born 1969), former right-handed relief pitcher in Major League Baseball
Nen Sothearoth (born 1995), Cambodian footballer
Trần Văn Nên (born 1927), former Vietnamese cyclist

Other uses 
Nen language (Cameroon), a Bantoid language of Cameroon
Nen language (Papuan), a language of Papua New Guinea
Nen River, a river in China
Nen Anime, a form of magic from the anime Hunter x Hunter

See also

Nela (name)